The 2023 Hyderabad ePrix, known for sponsorships reasons as the 2023 Greenko Hyderabad ePrix, was a Formula E electric car race held at the Hyderabad Street Circuit in the city of Hyderabad in Telangana, India on 11 February 2023 as the fourth round of the 2022–23 Formula E season. This was the inaugural running of a Formula E event at the track, as well as the first time an ePrix was held in India. It was also the first motorsport event hosted by the country as part of an FIA-sanctioned World Championship since the 2013 Indian Grand Prix a decade prior.

Background
Pascal Wehrlein entered the fourth round of the season as the points leader in the Drivers' Championship after winning both races at Diriyah, with Jake Dennis second by 6 points. In the first three previous races this season, only Wehrlein and Dennis finished in the first two positions. Avalanche Andretti led the Teams' Championship, 2 points ahead of TAG Heuer Porsche.

Impact
The government of Telangana introduced three double-decker electric buses in preparation for the race. This marks the return of double decker buses to Hyderabad for the first time since 2003.

Free practice
In Free Practice 1, held on 10 February at 4:30 PM, Pascal Wehrlein crashed hard into the barriers with an apparent vehicle malfunction causing Porsche to pit all of the cars on both Porsche teams – TAG Heuer Porsche and Avalanche Andretti.

Classification
(All times are in IST)

Qualifying
Qualifying took place at 10:40 AM on 11 February.

Qualifying duels 

* Sam Bird, Edoardo Mortara and René Rast all had their quarter-finals times deleted for exceeding track limits. Mortara and Rast had been seeded into the same duel, so neither driver advanced to the semi-finals. For this reason, Jean-Éric Vergne was not matched against any driver in the semi-finals and automatically advanced to the finals.

Overall classification

Race
The race took place on February 11 at 3:03 PM.

Notes:
  – Pole position.
  – Fastest lap.

Notes

References

|- style="text-align:center"
|width="35%"|Previous race:2023 Diriyah ePrix
|width="30%"|FIA Formula E World Championship2022–23 season
|width="35%"|Next race:2023 Cape Town ePrix
|- style="text-align:center"
|width="35%"|Previous race:N/A
|width="30%"|Hyderabad ePrix
|width="35%"|Next race:Unknown
|- style="text-align:center"

2023
2022–23 Formula E season
2023 in Indian motorsport
February 2023 sports events in India